John Bulmer Hobson (14 January 1883 – 8 August 1969) was a leading member of the Irish Volunteers and the Irish Republican Brotherhood (IRB) before the Easter Rising in 1916.  Although he was a member of the IRB which had planned the Rising, he opposed and attempted to prevent it. He swore Patrick Pearse into the IRB in late 1913. He was chief of staff of Fianna Éireann, which he helped to found.

Early life
Hobson was born at 5 Magdala Street, Belfast, to Benjamin Hobson, a grocer originally from County Armagh, and Mary Ann Bulmer, who was from England. However, numerous sources erroneously cite his place of birth as Holywood, County Down.

In 1901, the family was living in Hopefield Avenue in Belfast, before moving to the townland of Ballycultra, outside Holywood, by 1911.

Hobson had a "fairly strict" Quaker upbringing, according to Charles Townshend, possibly intensified by being sent to a Friends' boarding school in Lisburn. Hobson later resigned on principle from the Quakers soon after the 1914 Howth gun-running, as the Quakers are opposed to all forms of violence.

Bulmer's father was born in Armagh, although he later lived in Monasterevin, County Kildare, and was said to be a Gladstonian Home Ruler in politics, while his mother was an English-born radical. In 1911 she was reported to be on a suffragist procession in London and was long involved in Belfast cultural activities. She gave a lecture, entitled "Some Ulster Souterrains" as the Belfast Naturalists' Field Club's representative in 1901 at the British Association's annual meeting in Leicester. With the poet Alice Milligan, she organised the Irishwomen's Association, whose home reading circle met in the Hobsons' house. Hobson began at 13 to subscribe to a nationalist journal, Shan Van Vocht, published by Milligan. Soon after he joined the Gaelic League and the Gaelic Athletic Association.

IRB and the Volunteers
Hobson was sworn into the IRB in 1904 by Denis McCullough, their head in Belfast. Together they founded the Dungannon Clubs, whose object was to celebrate the victory of Volunteers of 1782 in restoring to Ireland her own Parliament, although they were additionally an "open front" for the IRB. The Volunteers of 1782 were an armed militia whose success, they suggested, could offer instructive lessons. The first Dungannon Club manifesto read: “The Ireland we seek to build is not an Ireland for the Catholic or the Protestant, but an Ireland for every Irishman Irrespective of his creed or class." Under the direction of Denis McCullough, Hobson became one of the key figures in the ongoing revitalisation of the IRB in Ulster, along with Seán Mac Diarmada, Patrick McCartan and Ernest Blythe.

Hobson moved to Dublin in 1907, and soon became a close friend of veteran Fenian Tom Clarke, with whom he had a very close relationship until 1914. In August 1909, with Constance Markievicz, he founded Na Fianna Éireann as a Republican scouting movement. In 1911 the republican newspaper Irish Freedom was founded, to which Hobson was an early contributor, and later that year he took over the editorship of it from Patrick McCartan.

Hobson was elevated to the IRB's Supreme Council in 1911, which coincided with the resignations of P.T. Daly, Fred Allen and Sean O'Hanlon, opening the way for Tom Clarke and the younger men to take control of the IRB. In 1913 he was elevated to the chairman of the Dublin Centres Board of the IRB, and later that year was one of the founding organisers of the Irish Volunteers, remaining a primary connection between the Volunteers and the IRB. He put together the plan to bring sufficient Volunteers and their supporters, discreetly to Howth on Sunday, 26 July 1914, to unload and distribute the arms being landed from the Asgard at Howth. 

As secretary and a member of the Volunteers provisional council, Hobson was instrumental in allowing Parliamentary leader John Redmond to gain control of the Volunteers organisation. He reluctantly gave in to Home Rule supporters' demands for control, believing that defying Redmond, who was popular with most rank-and-file Volunteers, would cause a split and would lead to the demise of the Volunteers. Clarke, steadfastly opposed to this action, never forgave him or spoke to him informally again. Hobson resigned as a member of the Supreme Council of the IRB, and was fired from his job as Dublin correspondent for the Gaelic American newspaper.

Hobson remained a member of the IRB, but, like the Volunteers' chief-of-staff Eoin MacNeill, he was kept unaware of the plans for the Rising. Though he could detect underground preparations, he had no certain evidence. He was later informed that volunteers had received orders for the Rising, timed for Easter Sunday, and he subsequently alerted MacNeill about what the IRB had planned. MacNeill issued a countermanding order, which served to delay the Rising by a day, and kept most of the Volunteers from participating. Hobson was kidnapped by Séamus O'Doherty on the orders of the organisers of the rising to stop him from spreading news of MacNeill's order, and held at gunpoint at O'Doherty's house in Phibsborough until the Rising was well underway. After the Rising, Hobson went to Eoin MacNeil's home of Woodtown Park to avoid arrest, an action which hurt his future political prospects and led to rumours that he was a traitor to the Volunteers and the IRB.

MacNeill later served in the Irish Free State government but Hobson was confined to a civil service job in the Department of Post and Telegraphs after Independence. Although he had been one of the most active members of the IRB for years, and was instrumental in the founding of the Volunteers, Hobson took no major role in politics after the Rising, or the subsequent Irish War of Independence (although he was later an occasional adviser to Clann na Poblachta). In 1922 he was appointed Chief of the Revenue Commissioners Stamp Department, the first of the departments that the IRB had infiltrated to any depth.

In 1947 he criticised the Rising and its leader saying the military council had "no plans.....which could seriously be called military" and that the Rising consisted of "locking a body of men up in two or three buildings to stay there until they were shot or burned out."

Later years
Hobson penned many economic works, writing from a Keynesian perspective. He believed that an economic resurgence was necessary to convince unionists to be a part of a United Ireland. Hobson hoped to eradicate poverty and founded the 'League for Social Justice'.

After his retirement in 1948, Hobson built a house near Roundstone, Connemara. His wife Claire (née Gregan), from whom he had separated in the late 1930s, died in 1958. After suffering a heart attack in the 1960s, Hobson lived with his daughter and son-in-law, Camilla and John Mitchell, in Castleconnell, County Limerick, where he finished his account of his life, titled Ireland, Yesterday and Tomorrow (Anvil Books, Ireland, 1968).

Death and legacy
He died on 8 August 1969, aged 86, in Castleconnell, County Limerick and is buried at Gurteen Cemetery near Roundstone in Connemara, County Galway.

The novelist Brian Moore was a family friend. Moore's last published work before his death in 1999  was an essay entitled "Going Home". It was a reflection inspired by a visit he made to Hobson's grave. The essay was commissioned by Granta and published in The New York Times on 7 February 1999. Despite Moore's often conflicted attitude to Ireland and his Irishness, his concluding reflection in the piece was "The past is buried until, in Connemara, the sight of Bulmer Hobson's grave brings back those faces, those scenes, those sounds and smells which now live only in my memory. And in that moment I know that when I die I would like to come home at last to be buried here in this quiet place among the grazing cows."

Published works
A short history of the Irish volunteers (1918)
(as editor) The letters of Wolfe Tone (1920) 
(as editor)The life of Wolfe Tone (1921)
The New Querist: containing several queries, proposed to the consideration of the public (1933), Dublin: Candle Press
Ireland, Yesterday and Tomorrow (1968), Anvil Books

See also
Protestant Irish nationalists

References

Sources
 Coogan, Tim Pat1916: The Easter Rising, (Phoenix 2001) .
 Dudgeon, Jeffrey Roger Casement: The Black Diaries with a Study of his Background, Sexuality and Irish Political Life, (Belfast Press 2002).
 Hay, Marnie Bulmer Hobson and the Nationalist Movement in Twentieth—Century Ireland, (MUP 2009), .
 Jackson, T.A Ireland Her Own, Lawrence & Wishart, Fp 1947, Rp 1991, .
 Martin, F.X (ed.), Leaders and Men of the Easter Rising: Dublin, 1916, (London 1967).
 O'Hegarty, P.S A History of Ireland Under the Union, (Dublin 1952).

External links
 

1883 births
1969 deaths
Irish Quakers
Former Quakers
Writers from Belfast
Members of the Irish Republican Brotherhood
People educated at Friends' School, Lisburn
Protestant Irish nationalists